The Price of Wisdom is a 1935 British drama film directed by Reginald Denham and starring Mary Jerrold, Roger Livesey and Lilian Oldland. It was made at British and Dominions Elstree Studios as a quota quickie for release by the British subsidiary of Paramount Pictures.

Cast
 Mary Jerrold as Mary Temple  
 Roger Livesey as Peter North  
 Lilian Oldland as Jean Temple  
 Robert Rendel as Alfred Blake  
 Eric Cowley as Colonel Layton  
 Ann Codrington as Miss Stokes  
 Ivor Barnard as Bonny  
 Cicely Oates as Pollitt

References

Bibliography
 Low, Rachael. Filmmaking in 1930s Britain. George Allen & Unwin, 1985.
 Wood, Linda. British Films, 1927-1939. British Film Institute, 1986.

External links

1935 films
British drama films
1935 drama films
Films directed by Reginald Denham
Films set in England
Quota quickies
British black-and-white films
British and Dominions Studios films
Films shot at Imperial Studios, Elstree
1930s English-language films
1930s British films